Araeosteus rothi is an extinct species of bony fish closely related to the modern-day prowfish, Zaprora silenus. A. rothi is found in Late Miocene marine strata of Southern California, primarily the Diatom Beds of Lompoc and the Santa Monica Mountains.

Etymology
The generic name is a compound word meaning "slender bone."  The specific name honors one Almon Edward Roth of Stanford University.

See also
List of prehistoric bony fish

References

Zaproridae
Miocene fish of North America
Fossils of the United States
Taxa named by David Starr Jordan